Cold Specks is the stage name of Somali Canadian singer-songwriter Ladan Hussein, who was previously known as Al Spx. Her music has been described as doom-soul. The name Cold Specks is taken from a line in James Joyce's Ulysses ("Born all in the dark wormy earth, cold specks of fire, evil, lights shining in the darkness.").

She released her debut album, I Predict a Graceful Expulsion, on May 21, 2012, on Mute Records and Arts & Crafts in Canada. The album was a shortlisted nominee for the 2012 Polaris Music Prize.

Her second album, Neuroplasticity, was released on August 26, 2014. It featured trumpet playing by Ambrose Akinmusire and backing vocals from Michael Gira of Swans, was supported in part by selected dates opening for Sufjan Stevens on his Carrie & Lowell Tour, and was longlisted for the 2015 Polaris Music Prize. Her third album, Fool's Paradise, followed in 2017.

Following Fool's Paradise, Hussein suffered a mental health breakdown, and underwent several months of treatment at Toronto's Centre for Addiction and Mental Health. She has since announced that she is retiring her stage name, and will release future music under her own name.

Albums

2012: I Predict a Graceful Expulsion #86 CAN
2014: Neuroplasticity
2017: Fool's Paradise

Singles
 2011: "Holland"
 2012: "Winter Solstice"
 2012: "Blank Maps"
 2012: "Hector"
 2014: "Absisto"
 2015: "Bodies at Bay"
 2017: "Fool's Paradise"

Awards and nominations

References

External links
 Instagram
 Twitter

Year of birth missing (living people)
Living people
21st-century Black Canadian women singers
Canadian people of Somali descent
Place of birth missing (living people)
Canadian women singer-songwriters
Mute Records artists
Arts & Crafts Productions artists
Canadian soul singers